An enabling technology is an invention or innovation that can be applied to drive radical change in the capabilities of a user or culture. Enabling technologies are characterized by rapid development of subsequent derivative technologies, often in diverse fields. See General purpose technology.

Equipment and/or methodology that, solely or in combination with associated technologies, provides the means to increase performance and capabilities of the user, product or process. An enabling technology have capability to radically improve or positively change the status quo. It is in recognition of this potential that the United Nations Sustainable Development Goal 5 targets the use of enabling technology to promote the empowerment of women.

Historically significant enabling technologies

The history of enabling technology can be broken down into three different time periods, the ancient era, the classical era, and the modern era. All three eras had extremely important enabling technologies within them, although the modern era has the most due to the industrial revolution and the information age.

Ancient and prehistorical eras
Mechanics: Established by Archytas the Tarantine as a combination of mathematics and structures
Glasses: Allowed visually impaired people to actually see clearly for the first time
Ceramics: Artificial material created by firing several raw materials together creating a hard, rock like product
The plow: Farming tool that allowed for faster preparation of soil before planting
Gunpowder: Revolutionized warfare from swords, catapults, and bows to gun fights

Classical era
 The printing press: Revolutionized the way people conceive and describe the world they live in, ushering in the period of modernity
The telescope: Allowed for more detailed exploration of the universe beyond what the human eye could comprehend
Refrigeration: Allowed for human control of air temperature to keep goods and food fresh for a longer period of time
Mariner's compass: Allowed sailors to navigate the seas without having to use celestial bodies

Modern era
Manufacturing: The rapid creation of usable products in large abundance, seen early in the automobile industry
Reinforced concrete: Allowed for the building of taller and stronger buildings, leading to the birth of skyscrapers
Elevator: Allowed buildings to be built higher instead of wider, which caused cities' population densities to spike
Steam engine: The stationary steam engine was a key component of the Industrial Revolution, allowing factories to locate where water power was unavailable
 Electric motor: Machine that converts electrical energy into mechanical energy using electricity and magnetic fields, creating a dynamic and cost effective motor
Incandescent light bulb: Invented by Thomas Edison, this let individuals switch from oil powered lighting to electrical powered lighting
Rechargeable battery: Created the opportunity to have a single battery for machines that can be recharged, rather than using multiple batteries
Ballpoint pen: Created a way to write more consistently and comfortably without having to dip your pen in ink
Bessemer process: Revolutionized the steel refining process, making it much quicker
Photography: Revolutionized portraiture and art 
Telephone: Alexander Graham Bell invented the telephone which revolutionized communication between geographically distant individuals
FM radio: Allowed for the transmission of audio from a broadcast tower to radios within range
 Internal combustion engine: The stepping stone for the modern automobile, which revolutionized transportation
 Anesthetics: Allowed for more serious and longer surgeries with much more comfort for the patients
 Antibiotics: Allowed for effective treatment of infectious diseases, most of which were previously lethal
 Flight: Revolutionized travel and transportation across the world
 Personal computer: Allowed for extremely fast calculating times and later was the basis for the Internet
 Internet: The Internet has enabled new forms of social interaction, activities, and social associations
 Cloud computing: Allowed for affordable and fast access to high end computing equipment over the internet
 Interseasonal thermal energy storage: Enables recycling of waste heat and utilization of natural energy (e.g., summer's solar heat or winter's cold) for heating or cooling in the opposite season
 3D printing: "Three-dimensional printing makes it as cheap to create single items as it is to produce thousands and thus undermines economies of scale. It may have as profound an impact on the world as the coming of the factory did."

Impact of technology on society

Throughout history, technology has continuously influenced all aspect of the society. It has impacted how humans think, learn and communicate. The world is presently witness an era with frequent technological inventions, which have both positive and negative impacts on how people go about their daily activities.

See also
Technology
Technological evolution
Technology and society
Critique of technology
Philosophy of technology
Technology lifecycle

References

Innovation
Inventions
Technology by type